Bakhtawar Bhutto-Zardari (born 25 January 1990) is a Pakistani public figure and educationist. She is the chairperson of SZABIST. She is the daughter of former Prime Minister Benazir Bhutto and former President Asif Ali Zardari, sister of incumbent Foreign Minister Bilawal Bhutto Zardari, and granddaughter of former Prime Minister Zulfikar Ali Bhutto, making her a member of the politically prominent Bhutto family of Pakistan. She is also a trustee of SZABIST Foundation. and Sindh Peoples Welfare Trust.

Early life and education

Bakhtawar Bhutto-Zardari was born at the Lady Dufferin Hospital in Karachi, Sindh, on 25 January 1990. She is the eldest daughter of the first female prime minister of Pakistan and the Muslim world, Benazir Bhutto and former president of Pakistan Asif Ali Zardari. She was born while Bhutto was serving her first term as prime minister, making her the first child born to a sitting prime minister in history. She is the granddaughter of former president and prime minister of Pakistan, Zulfikar Ali Bhutto, and Begum Nusrat Bhutto Ispahani. Her paternal grandfather, Hakim Ali Zardari, was a businessman, politician, and member of the National Assembly of Pakistan. From her mother's side, she is the niece of politicians Murtaza Bhutto and Shahnawaz Bhutto. Politician Ghinwa Bhutto is her aunt by marriage. Author Fatima Bhutto and Zulfikar Ali Bhutto Jr are her first cousins.

From her father's side, her aunts are politicians Azra Fazal Pechuho and Faryal Talpur.

For early education, Bakhtawar Zardari attended Karachi Grammar School in Karachi and OPF School in Islamabad. In 1996 Benazir Bhutto sought exile in Dubai with her three children in 1998 where Bakhtawar started and completed her secondary high-school education at Latifa School for Girls. For further studies, she studied at the University of Edinburgh and in 2012 graduated with a degree of master of arts in the college of humanities and social science, with honours in english literature.

Career
Bakhtawar is the chairperson of Shaheed Zulfikar Ali Bhutto Institute of Science and Technology (SZABIST). The HEC recognized organization was founded by her mother in 1995 and has numerous university campuses, schools, and technical and vocational centers across Pakistan. The institute is named after her grandfather. It is also the only Pakistani university with an offshore campus in Dubai where Bakhtawar started her affiliation in 2008 before being elected Chairperson by the board in 2019.

Though Bakhtawar does not participate in mainstream politics she remains vocal as a social activist online to her three million Twitter followers.

Personal life

Bakhtawar married Mahmood Younas Choudhry, son of a prominent business tycoon from Texas on January 30, 2021. She gave birth to their son Mir Hakim Mahmood Choudhry on October 10, 2021. He is named after Bakhtawar Bhutto-Zardari's late grandfather Hakim Ali Zardari and uncle Mir Murtaza Bhutto. She gave birth to their second son Mir Sijawal Mahmood Choudhry on October 5, 2022.

References 

1990 births
Living people
Baloch people
Pakistani people of Iranian descent
Pakistani Shia Muslims
Zardari family